Kim Ji-hyun may refer to:
Kim Ji-hyun (singer) (born 1972), singer and actress
Kim Ji-hyun (badminton) (born 1974), South Korean badminton player
Kim Ji-hyun (actress) (born 1982),  South Korean actress
Kim Ji-hyeon (footballer) (born 1996), South Korean footballer
Kim Ji-hyon (born 1995), South Korean freestyle skier
G.Soul (born 1988), South Korean singer
Kim Ji-heun (born 1989), South Korean swimmer